Monoxenus balteoides is a species of beetle in the family Cerambycidae. It was described by Stephan von Breuning in 1939.

It's 18 mm long and 7.5 mm wide, and its type locality is Kibosho, Kilimanjaro Region.

References

balteoides
Beetles described in 1939
Taxa named by Stephan von Breuning (entomologist)